Sergey Gomonov ( (Syarhey Homanaw), ; 29 June 1961 – 19 September 2010) was a Soviet and Belarusian footballer and later a coach.

Honours
MPKC Mozyr
Belarusian Premier League champion: 1996
Belarusian Cup champion: 1995–96

External links
 

1961 births
2010 deaths
Belarusian footballers
Soviet footballers
Association football defenders
Belarusian expatriate footballers
Expatriate footballers in Ukraine
Expatriate footballers in Georgia (country)
Belarusian Premier League players
FC Dynamo Brest players
FC Dinamo Minsk players
FC Dnepr Mogilev players
FC Molodechno players
FC Temp Shepetivka players
FC Slavia Mozyr players
FC Rechitsa-2014 players
Belarusian football managers
FC Zvezda-BGU Minsk managers
FC Vedrich-97 Rechitsa managers